António Simão Muanza (born 4 August 2003), commonly known as Maestro, is an Angolan professional footballer who plays as a midfielder for Liga Portugal 2 team Benfica B.

Club career
Maestro is a product of Academia de Futebol de Angola. He joined Portuguese club Estrela in January 2022. He made his professional debut on 18 January 2022 in a 2–2 draw against Mafra.

In July 2022, Maestro joined Benfica B on a four-year deal until 2026.

International career
Maestro is an Angolan youth international. He has represented Angola at the 2019 Africa U-17 Cup of Nations and 2019 FIFA U-17 World Cup.

Career statistics

References

External links
 

2003 births
Living people
Footballers from Luanda
Association football midfielders
Angolan footballers
Angola youth international footballers
Liga Portugal 2 players
C.F. Estrela da Amadora players
S.L. Benfica B players
Angolan expatriate footballers
Angolan expatriate sportspeople in Portugal
Expatriate footballers in Portugal